Udgharsha is a 2019 Kannada language action thriller film, written and directed by Sunil Kumar Desai. The film was also dubbed in Telugu and Malayalam with the same title and in Tamil language as Uchakattam. The film is produced by Devaraj under the banner D Creations and is touted to be a suspense thriller. The film features a multi-lingual ensemble cast of Thakur Anoop Singh, Sai Dhansika, Harsihka Poonacha, Kishore, Dr Kingmoohan,
Tanya Hope, Kabir Duhan Singh, Prabhakar, and Shraddha Das in the lead roles.

Plot
Rashmi pays the price for capturing an incident on her mobile phone at a resort, where she had gone along with her boyfriend, Aditya. A gang leader, Dharmendra, tries to kill her and destroy the evidence. Rashmi hides herself in a car, which then happens to travel to Madikeri. Aditya, in order to follow her, has no option but to take the help of a passerby, Karishma, who ends up in the woods, and a cat-and-mouse game begins.

In parallel, Vijay Menon and his secretary Krithika went on vacation. Dharmendra assigns Krithika to kill Vijay. What happens to Rashmi, Aditya and Karishma and the reality behind the murder assigned to Krithika forms the crux of Udgharsha.

Cast 
 Thakur Anoop Singh as Adhitya
 Dhansika as Rashmi 
 Tanya Hope as Karishma
 Harshika Poonacha
 Kabir Duhan Singh as Dharmendra 
 Shraddha Das as Krithika
 Prabhakar
 Kishore as Vijay Menon
 Sravan Raghavendra
 Vamsi Krishna

Production 
In an interview with New Indian Express , the director said that Udgharsha is unique as it "has only 20 minutes of dialogue, the rest of the film will contain shots, music and effects". Bollywood music director Sanjoy Chowdhury who is considered to be a specialist in background music has scored the music for the film. The first look of the film was released on social media and has generated a lot of interest. The majority of the film has been shot in Kodagu.

References

External links 
 

2010s Kannada-language films
2019 action thriller films
Indian action thriller films
2019 films
Films directed by Sunil Kumar Desai